"Another Future" is a single by Japanese boy band Kis-My-Ft2. It was released on August 13, 2014. It debuted in number one on the weekly Oricon Singles Chart and reached number one on the Billboard Japan Hot 100. It was the 3rd best-selling single in Japan in August 2014, with 250,473 copies. It was the 23rd best-selling single of the year in Japan, with 263,615 copies.

References 

2014 singles
2014 songs
Japanese-language songs
Kis-My-Ft2 songs
Oricon Weekly number-one singles
Billboard Japan Hot 100 number-one singles
Song articles with missing songwriters
Japanese television drama theme songs